Bonners Ferry (Kutenai language: ʔaq̓anqmi) is the largest city and the county seat of Boundary County, Idaho, United States. The population was 2,543 at the 2010 census.

History
When gold was discovered in the East Kootenays of British Columbia in 1863, thousands of prospectors from all over the West surged northward over a route that became known as the Wildhorse Trail. Edwin Bonner, a merchant from Walla Walla, Washington, established a ferry in 1864 where the trail crossed the broad Kootenai River. In 1875, Richard Fry, and his Sinixt wife, Justine Su-steel Fry, leased the business, but the location retained the name of the original founder and later became the town of Bonners Ferry.

Before the gold rush, only a few visitors had come to the region; one of the first was explorer David Thompson, a cartographer for the North West Company. Thompson and four fellow fur traders arrived in 1808 to trade with the Lower Kootenais. The local natives gave Thompson's party dried fish and moss bread.  Thompson returned the next year and established a trading post on Lake Pend Oreille. He was followed in 1846 by Jesuit Priest Father DeSmet, a missionary to the Kootenai Tribe.

The Oregon Question was settled by the Oregon Treaty of 1846 which established the 49th Parallel north as the boundary between the US and British North America. Government surveyors of the Boundary Commission came in 1858 to establish the border between the United States and British Columbia.

Bonners Ferry in the 1880s flourished due to the mines in the north. Entering service in 1883 the Norwegian-built steamer Midge transported passengers and freight between Bonners Ferry and British Columbia for 25 years. In 1892 The Great Northern Railway was built, followed by the Spokane International and the Kootenai Valley lines.

The village of Bonners Ferry was formally established in 1893, along the south bank of the Kootenai River. Scattered along the valley and benchland were a few ranches and homesteads. Numerous mines were developed in the nearby mountains, including the Continental Mine in the Selkirks. The lumber industry also grew rapidly. Bonners Ferry, perched on stilts to avoid the inevitable spring floods, appeared to be a boom town.

Moving into the 20th century, the town became the center of a lumbering and farming community. The valley land was drained, levees were constructed and farms were cleared on the benches. The rich Kootenai Valley became known as the "Nile of the North," while the Bonners Ferry Lumber Company grew to be one of the world's largest lumber mills. The downtown took shape as brick buildings were constructed, replacing those on stilts. Completion of the Libby Dam in 1975 lessened the threat of serious flooding. Today, much of Main Street dates from this initial period of solid, permanent construction.

On September 20, 1974, the Kootenai Tribe, headed by chairwoman Amy Trice, declared war on the United States government. Their first act was to post soldiers on each end of the highway that runs through the town who would ask people to pay a toll to drive through what had been the tribe's aboriginal land. The money would be used to house and care for elderly tribal members. Most tribes in the United States are forbidden to declare war on the U.S. government because of treaties, but the Kootenai Tribe never signed a treaty. The dispute resulted in the concession by the United States government and a land grant of  that is now the Kootenai Reservation.

Bonners Ferry is 8 miles (13 km) from the site of the Ruby Ridge confrontation and siege in 1992, which occurred just outside Naples, Idaho.

Geography and climate
Bonners Ferry is located 27 miles (43.5 km) south of the Canada-United States border at  (48.692110, −116.317626), at an altitude of 1,896 feet (578 m).

Bonners Ferry has a humid continental climate (Köppen Dfb/Dsb) with cold, snowy winters and dry summers with hot days and cool nights. It is almost warm enough to be classed as a Mediterranean climate or oceanic climate, and snow depths above  occur on 23.6 days on average.

Demographics

2010 census
As of the census of 2010, there were 2,543 people, 1,117 households, and 631 families residing in the city. The racial makeup of the city was 94.3 percent White, 0.2 percent African American, 2.0 percent Native American, 0.6 percent Asian, 0.2 percent Pacific Islander, 0.5 percent from other races, and 2.2 percent from 2 or more races. Hispanic or Latino of any race were 4.7 percent of the population.

There were 1,117 households, of which 27.6 percent had children under the age of 18 living with them, 39.1 percent were married couples living together, 12.5 percent had a female householder with no husband present, 4.8 percent had a male householder with no wife present, and 43.5 percent were non-families. 38.6 percent of all households were made up of individuals, and 20% had someone living alone who was 65 years of age or older. The average household size was 2.22 and the average family size was 2.91.

The median age in the city was 41.9 years. 23.7 percent of residents were under the age of 18; 7.5 percent were between the ages of 18 and 24; 21.9 percent were from 25 to 44; 27.4 percent were from 45 to 64; and 19.5 percent were 65 years of age or older. The gender makeup of the city was 48.0 percent male and 52.0 percent female.

2000 census
As of the census of 2000, there were 2,515 people, 1,027 households, and 650 families residing in the city. The racial makeup of the city was 95.67 percent White, 0.04 percent African American, 1.59 percent Native American, 0.52 percent Asian, 1.31 percent from other races, and 0.87 percent from 2 or more races. Hispanic or Latino of any race were 4.29 percent of the population.

There were 1,027 households, out of which 31.7 percent had children under the age of 18 living with them, 48.0 percent were married couples living together, 11.2 percent had a female householder with no husband present, and 36.7 percent were non-families. 32.9 percent of all households were made up of individuals, and 15.5 percent had someone living alone who was 65 years of age or older.  The average household size was 2.37 and the average family size was 3.00.

In the city, the population was spread out, with 26.9 percent under the age of 18, 8.2 percent from 18 to 24, 24.5 percent from 25 to 44, 21.3 percent from 45 to 64, and 19.1 percent who were 65 years of age or older. The median age was 39 years. For every 100 females, there were 92.7 males. For every 100 females age 18 and over, there were 86.8 males.

The median income for a household in the city was $24,509, and the median income for a family was $35,237. Males had a median income of $28,558 versus $16,776 for females. The per capita income for the city was $13,343. About 17.3 percent of families and 20.0 percent of the population were below the poverty line, including 28.6 percent of those under age 18 and 10.9 percent of those age 65 or over.

Politics

Transportation
Boundary County Airport is a county-owned, public-use airport located 2 nautical miles (3.7 km) northeast of the central business district of Bonners Ferry.

Local media
Bonners Ferry has been home to KBFI AM 1450 since 1983. It is owned by local licensee Radio Bonners Ferry, Inc, owned by Blue Sky Broadcasting, Inc. While licensed to Bonners Ferry and having its  transmitter site located there, KBFI shares studios and offices with its sister stations (KSPT, KIBR, and KPND), in nearby Sandpoint, Idaho.

A prominent newspaper in Bonners Ferry is the weekly Bonners Ferry Herald, owned by Hagadone Publishing.

The Kootenai Valley Times was a newspaper in Bonners Ferry, Idaho, covering local news, sports, business, jobs, and community events. Print circulation at the time of closure was 1,559 copies. In March 2018, in response to various pressures on traditional print media, KootenaiValleyTimes.com was launched to continue to provide local news and information.

Sports 
Bonners Ferry High School has physical education programs such as wrestling, football, baseball, soccer, cheer, dance, golf, and basketball.

There are teams fielded for Little league  baseball, in association with nearby Sandpoint, Idaho.Bonners Ferry Little League registration open

Other languages
Some of the Kootenai Tribe of Idaho speak the city name of their language as Bonners Ferry (Ktunaxa: k̓akanmituk ʔa·kaq̓ǂaʔhaǂ, ʔaq̓anqmi).

Notable people

Christopher John Boyce, American spy
Denis Johnson, author, journalist
Claire Du Brey, silent film actress
Johnny James, baseball player
Rita La Roy, silent film actress

References

External links
 

 
Cities in Idaho
Cities in Boundary County, Idaho
County seats in Idaho
Populated places established in 1864
1864 establishments in Idaho Territory